

Portugal
 Angola – 
 Sebastião Lopes de Calheiros e Meneses, Governor-General of Angola (1861–1862)
 José Baptista de Andrade, Governor-General of Angola (1862–1865)
 Portuguese East Africa -

United Kingdom
Lagos Colony -
 William McCoskry, Acting Governor (1861–1862)
 Henry Stanhope Freeman, Governor (1862–1865)
Malta Colony – John Le Marchant, Governor of Malta (1858–1864)
New South Wales – John Young, Baron Lisgar, Governor of New South Wales (1861–1867)
 Queensland – Sir George Bowen, Governor of Queensland (1859–1868)
 Tasmania – Colonel Thomas Browne, Governor of Tasmania (1862–1868)
 South Australia 
 Sir Richard Graves MacDonnell, Governor of South Australia (1855–1862)
 Sir Dominick Daly, Governor of South Australia (1862–1868)
 Victoria – Sir Henry Barkly, Governor of Victoria (1856–1863)
 Western Australia 
 Sir Arthur Kennedy, Governor of Western Australia (1855–1862)
 John Hampton, Governor of Western Australia (1862–1868)

Colonial governors
Colonial governors
1862